Woolworths New Zealand Limited (formerly Progressive Enterprises) is the second largest grocery company in New Zealand (behind Foodstuffs), with revenue of NZ$6.2 billion for the year to June 2018. Alongside Foodstuffs, Woolworths NZ forms part of the New Zealand supermarket duopoly.

Progressive Enterprises Limited was once owned by the Western Australian Supermarket Group FAL – Foodland Associated Limited which operated Action Supermarkets, Supa Valu Supermarkets and Dewsons Supermarkets. It is now a wholly owned subsidiary of the Australian Woolworths Group.

History 
 1948: Progressive Enterprises Limited was established on 9 February 1949 by the Picot family.
 1961: Progressive Enterprises became the parent company to Foodtown Supermarkets Limited.
 1974: Albert Gubay opens the first 3Guys store. Progressive Enterprises purchased the chain in 1987, and rebranded or closed them throughout the 1990s with the store in Hillcrest, Hamilton being one of the last when it closed in January 1998.
 1988: Progressive Enterprises became part of Australian business Coles Myer
 1992: Coles Myer relaunched Progressive Enterprises onto the New Zealand stock exchange as a public company.

On 25 May 2005, it was announced that Woolworths Limited, one of Australia's largest retailers, would be purchasing Progressive Enterprises along with 22 Action stores in Australia. The deal was worth approximately NZ$2.5 billion and culminated in the official transfer of assets on 24 November 2005.

In 2006, company workers at three distribution centres initiated industrial action in an attempt to win a collective employment agreement and pay rise.
The company responded by suspending grocery distribution centre operations and allowing suppliers to send stock directly to supermarkets.

Also in 2006, the company was awarded the Roger Award For The Worst Transnational Corporation Operating in New Zealand.

On 15 August 2007, Progressive Enterprises announced employees on youth rates or under the age of 18 would get paid adult rates, which in some cases can be up to an 80% pay increase. The average pay increased from $9.00 to $13.50.

In August 2011, Progressive Enterprises won a marketing award. On 22 June 2018, Progressive Enterprise Limited renamed to Woolworths New Zealand Limited.

Store brands

Woolworths NZ runs the following grocery store chains:

 Countdown: 184 supermarket stores
 SuperValue: 40 stores – convenience supermarket stores, run as a franchise
 FreshChoice: 30 stores – Higher quality supermarket with a large range, run as a franchise

It operates online grocery shopping in the name of Countdown.

Former operations
 3 Guys (also known as Gubays)
 Big Fresh
 Price Chopper
 Georgie Pie – A fast food chain, sold to McDonald's New Zealand in 1996
 Foodtown – The Foodtown brand was phased out in early 2012.
 Woolworths

Product brands
 Countdown
 Freefrom
 Macro
 Essentials
 The Odd Bunch

Former product brands
 Signature Range
 Naytura
 FreshZone
 Basics
 No Frills
 Woolworths Select
 Home Brand

See also
 2006 Progressive Enterprises dispute (pay dispute resulting in industrial action at several distribution centres)

References

External links
 Progressive Enterprises Limited
 Press release – Woolworths acquisition

Supermarkets of New Zealand
Retail companies of New Zealand
Retail companies established in 1949
Woolworths Group (Australia)
New Zealand companies established in 1949